Canaston Bridge is the location in Pembrokeshire, southwest Wales where the A40 trunk road crosses the Eastern Cleddau. It is about half a mile upstream of Blackpool Mill, at the normal tidal limit of the river.

Name
The origin of the name is obscure. Several properties use the name Canaston, as well as Canaston Wood.

Activity
A pumping station removes some 33 megalitres of water per day for Welsh Water. The river is monitored at Canaston Bridge for flood risk downstream. Hydrometric data at the bridge are kept by Natural Resources Wales.

Canaston Woods Walk, promoted by Pembrokeshire County Council, starts at Canaston Bridge.

History

In 1914, the Royal Commission on Monuments published details of the bridge, with an illustration: 

Canaston Bridge is on the border between the ancient parishes of Robeston Wathen and Slebech. It is marked on a 1578 parish map as Cannaston, with a bridge shown, but there was no recorded parish or settlement of that name. The Royal Commission recorded the name as a historic place name. Canaston Bridge is listed as a place name in the parish of Slebech and others, as it borders several.

Canaston Wood is a remnant of the mediaeval Narberth Forest, which was recorded in the early 12th century. The Manor of Canaston was recorded in the 14th century. Canaston Wood was mentioned as significant by George Owen in about 1600. Canaston Bridge itself is mediaeval, and is a Grade II listed structure. In 1635 there was a charcoal-fuelled blast furnace at Canaston Wood, the only known example of its period.

In 1828, an Act for repairing the roads also repealed an earlier Act of 1808, exacting tolls on the roads around the bridge.

Up to the time that the Cleddau Bridge was opened in 1975, Canaston Bridge was the lowest bridging point on the river.

In 2009, when the Robeston Wathen bypass was being constructed (including a new bridge), Dyfed Archaeological Trust carried out an investigation close to the bridge. They discovered flint scattering (mesolithic or neolithic) and evidence of early metal working.

Wildlife
Swallows and martins nest between the girders beneath the A40 road.

References

Villages in Pembrokeshire
Roundabouts in the United Kingdom